The Third Mother of all Battles Championship, commonly referred to as the 1993 Iraqi Elite Cup, was the third occurrence of the Iraqi Elite Cup, organised by the Iraq Football Association. The top six teams of the 1992–93 Iraqi National League competed in the tournament. The competition started on 15 September 1993 and ended on 24 September 1993 where, in the final, held at Al-Shaab Stadium, Al-Talaba defeated Al-Quwa Al-Jawiya 2–1.

Group stage

Group 1

Group 2

Semifinals

Third place match

Final

References

External links
 Iraqi Football Website

Football competitions in Iraq
1993–94 in Iraqi football